Buran Beadini (born 30 March 1955) is a Macedonian football manager and former defender who played for clubs in Yugoslavia and Turkey. He is of Albanian heritage.

Playing career

Club
Born in Tetovo, Beadini began playing football for local side FK Teteks. He helped Teteks gain promotion to the Yugoslav First League during his four seasons with the club. He also played one season with FC Prishtina in Yugoslav Second League in 1977–78.

Beadini joined Turkish Süper Lig side Eskişehirspor in January 1982. Five seasons later, he moved to rivals Samsunspor for four seasons.

Managerial career
After retiring from playing football, Beadini became a coach. He was the manager of FK Bashkimi during the 2005–06 season, leading them through their first appearance in European club competitions. He also managed Odunpazarispor during the 2007–08 season.

References

External links
  (as player)
  (as coach)
 

1955 births
Living people
Sportspeople from Tetovo
Association football defenders
Yugoslav footballers
Macedonian footballers
FK Teteks players
FC Prishtina players
Eskişehirspor footballers
Samsunspor footballers
Yugoslav First League players
Süper Lig players
Macedonian expatriate footballers
Yugoslav expatriate footballers
Expatriate footballers in Turkey
Macedonian expatriate sportspeople in Turkey
Yugoslav expatriate sportspeople in Turkey
Macedonian football managers
Eskişehirspor managers
FK Shkëndija managers
KF Bashkimi (1947–2008) managers
Macedonian expatriate football managers
Expatriate football managers in Turkey